Frank Meyer may refer to:

Frank Meyer (political philosopher) (1909–1972), American libertarian political philosopher
Sir Frank Meyer, 2nd Baronet (1886–1935), British businessman and Conservative Party Member of Parliament
Frank Nicholas Meyer (1875–1918), United States Department of Agriculture explorer
Frank A. Meyer (born 1944), Swiss journalist

See also
Francis Blackwell Mayer (1827–1899), American genre painter